Man Mein Hai Visshwas is an Indian drama anthology television series that aired on Sony TV channel. In the series, Nitish Bharadwaj presents stories that are real-life incidents experienced by people. They mainly revolve around faith.

The series premiered on 18 August 2006, and aired every Friday at 8pm IST.

Concept
The show will be portraying real life incidents related to God, faith, and miracles. Each episode is inspired by true life incidents that have occurred in the lives of people from all corners of India. Each episode will showcase experiences of people whose lives have changed after experiencing incidents that can be described as are described as "miraculous." Concept and written by-Vikas Kapoor

Hosts
Nitish Bharadwaj ... Season 1
Shakti Arora ....Season 2

Cast
Chandan Madan as Gooms

References

External links
 Official Website

Indian television series